is located in the Hidaka Mountains, Hokkaidō, Japan.

References
 Google Maps
 Geographical Survey Institute

Iwanai